Aguilar may refer to:

People
Aguilar (surname)

Places
Aguilar, Colorado, town in Las Animas County, Colorado, USA
Aguilar, Pangasinan, municipality in the province of Pangasinan, Philippines
Cape D'Aguilar, cape on Hong Kong Island
D'Aguilar National Park, national park in Queensland, Australia

Spain
Aguilar de Bureba, municipality and town in the province of Burgos, Castile and León
Aguilar de Campoo, town in the province of Palencia, Castile and León
Aguilar de Campos, municipality located in the province of Valladolid, Castile and León
Aguilar de Codés, town and municipality in Navarre
Aguilar de la Frontera, municipality and town in the province of Córdoba, Andalusia
Aguilar de Segarra, municipality in the province of Barcelona, Catalonia
Aguilar del Alfambra, municipality in the province of Teruel, Aragon
Aguilar del Río Alhama, municipality in La Rioja

Other
 – condemned 1825
Château d'Aguilar, a Cathar castle in the Aude département, France
Félix Aguilar Observatory, (Observatorio Félix Aguilar), astronomical observatory in Argentina
Gran Atlas Aguilar, first comprehensive world atlas of Spanish origin
Aguilar v. Felton, 473 U.S. 402 (1985), United States Supreme Court decision interpreting the Establishment Clause of the First Amendment to the United States Constitution
Aguilar v. Texas, 378 U.S. 108 (1964), U.S. Supreme Court decision interpreting and applying the Fourth Amendment to the United States Constitution
Aguilarite, mineral named for Ponciano Aguilar